Craig Colony may refer to:
 Craig Hospital, Englewood, Colorado, US
 Craig Colony (New York), US